Nimati is a village in the Alipurduar district of West Bengal. It is part of Buxa Tiger Reserve.

References

Villages in Alipurduar district